North Arlington is a borough in Bergen County, in the U.S. state of New Jersey. As of the 2020 United States census, the borough's population was 16,457, an increase of 1,065 (+6.9%) from the 2010 census count of 15,392, which in turn reflected an increase of 211 (+1.4%) from the 15,181 counted in the 2000 census.

As the site of Holy Cross Cemetery, which has interred almost 290,000 individuals since its establishment in 1915, and with another Jewish cemetery including several thousand more burials, North Arlington has almost 20 times more dead people than living, with more burials than the living population of Newark, the state's largest city. Holy Cross has an average of 2,600 interments each year, of which about 65% are burials, with the remainder split between entombment in mausoleums or crypts and burial of cremated remains. Expansion of the mausoleum will bring its capacity to nearly 36,000 interments, with the cemetery's total capacity of about 750,000 expected to last past the year 2090.

North Arlington was ranked eighth by Money magazine on its list of "Best Places to Live 2017", which cited the borough's healthy economy, affordable homes and a high quality of life.

History

North Arlington was originally part of an area called "New Barbadoes Neck".

Copper was mined at the Schuyler Copper Mine in present-day North Arlington during the 18th and 19th centuries. It was one of the first true copper mines in North America.

In 1755, the first steam engine in North America was assembled in North Arlington. The Newcomen steam engine was imported from England by John Schuyler to pump water out of his copper mine. He hired engineer Josiah Hornblower to assemble the machinery.

North Arlington was formed by a referendum passed on March 9, 1896, and incorporated as a borough by an act of the New Jersey Legislature on March 11, 1896, from area taken from Union Township.  It was called North Arlington because it was north of the Arlington section of Kearny, which had been named from the Arlington Station on the Erie Railroad.

North Arlington, together with Lyndhurst and Rutherford, was the site of the EnCap project, an effort to remediate landfills on the  site and construct homes and golf courses on top of the cleaned up site. On May 27, 2008, the New Jersey Meadowlands Commission terminated its agreement with EnCap Golf Holdings, the company that had the contract to redevelop the site, after the company had missed targets to clean up the landfills as part of the project.

On November 18, 2015, North Arlington approved plans for FedEx to build a  freight distribution facility on a former steel dumping ground on Porete Avenue. FedEx pledged to build a new access road to Porete Avenue from Belleville Turnpike, complete with a signalized traffic light, as part of construction. The company planned to hire 225 people to work at the facility. FedEx planned to complete the building by early 2017.

Geography
According to the United States Census Bureau, the borough had a total area of 2.53 square miles (6.55 km2), including 2.48 square miles (6.43 km2) of land and 0.05 square miles (0.12 km2) of water (1.78%).

The borough borders the municipalities of Lyndhurst in Bergen County; Belleville in Essex County; and Kearny in Hudson County.

Route 7 (Belleville Turnpike) occupies much of the border of between Bergen County to the north and Hudson County to the south, with North Arlington on one side and Kearny on the other. The bordering neighborhood in Kearny is called Arlington, from which the name North Arlington is derived. Cemeteries lie along both sides of the route, with North Arlington Jewish Cemetery in Bergen and Arlington Memorial Park in Hudson.

Demographics

2010 census

The Census Bureau's 2006–2010 American Community Survey showed that (in 2010 inflation-adjusted dollars) median household income was $71,232 (with a margin of error of +/− $6,829) and the median family income was $87,854 (+/− $9,834). Males had a median income of $56,437 (+/− $4,127) versus $47,794 (+/− $4,233) for females. The per capita income for the borough was $34,265 (+/− $2,555). About 4.6% of families and 5.5% of the population were below the poverty line, including 6.7% of those under age 18 and 5.6% of those age 65 or over.

Same-sex couples headed 39 households in 2010, an increase from the 28 counted in 2000.

2000 census
As of the 2000 United States census there were 15,181 people, 6,392 households, and 4,129 families residing in the borough. The population density was 5,880.7 people per square mile (2,271.9/km2). There were 6,529 housing units at an average density of 2,529.2 per square mile (977.1/km2). The ethnic makeup of the borough was 89.61% White, 0.46% African American, 0.14% Native American, 5.61% Asian, 0.01% Pacific Islander, 2.29% from other races, and 1.87% from two or more races. Hispanic or Latino of any race were 10.57% of the population.

There were 6,392 households, out of which 24.5% had children under the age of 18 living with them, 49.7% were married couples living together, 11.1% had a female householder with no husband present, and 35.4% were non-families. 30.9% of all households were made up of individuals, and 14.3% had someone living alone who was 65 years of age or older. The average household size was 2.37 and the average family size was 3.00.

In the borough the population was spread out, with 18.0% under the age of 18, 7.6% from 18 to 24, 30.8% from 25 to 44, 24.2% from 45 to 64, and 19.4% who were 65 years of age or older. The median age was 41 years. For every 100 females, there were 88.7 males. For every 100 females age 18 and over, there were 84.1 males.

The median income for a household in the borough was $51,787, and the median income for a family was $62,483. Males had a median income of $41,512 versus $34,769 for females. The per capita income for the borough was $24,441. About 3.4% of families and 5.1% of the population were below the poverty line, including 6.2% of those under age 18 and 6.1% of those age 65 or over.

Crime

According to the FBI's 2011 Uniform Crime Report, there were 263 crimes in the borough in 2011 (vs. 200 in 2010), of which 19 were violent crimes (vs. 12 in 2010) and 244 non-violent crimes (vs. 188 in the previous year). The 2011 total crime rate per thousand residents was 17.1 (vs. 13.0 in 2010), compared to 13.6 in Bergen County and 24.7 statewide. The violent crime rate was 1.2 per thousand in 2011 (up from 0.8 in the previous year), while the rate was 1.0 in the county and 3.1 in New Jersey.

Economy
Companies based in North Arlington include Pizza Land, located at 260 Belleville Turnpike, which was featured in the opening credits of The Sopranos.  Additionally, in Law & Order episode 10.6, "Marathon" (1999), a pizza box from the restaurant was used by a suspect to transport and conceal firearms.

Sports
The Inline Skating Club of America is a skating facility that is the home of the New Jersey Grizzlies of the Professional Inline Hockey Association Pro Division and the Wallington Grizzlies of the Professional Inline Hockey Association Minor League.

North Arlington offers an extensive public athletic/recreation program for youth, offering a boys and girls basketball leagues, a recreation bowling league, a girls softball league, little league baseball, a soccer association, and a popular football and cheerleading program, the "Junior Vikings", named after the North Arlington High School "Vikings". Additionally, to meet the needs of a growing population of children with special needs, North Arlington recreation offers "Recreation for Developmentally Challenged Children". This program includes cooperation from neighboring towns, and consists of Spring baseball and soccer. The recreation program serves adults with an adult men's basketball league as well as an adult women's volleyball program.

Parks and recreation
Riverside County Park is a Bergen County Park covering , located on River Road between Lyndhurst and North Arlington. It has a playground, athletic fields, tennis courts, a Bocce ball court and fitness center.

Government

Local government
North Arlington is governed under the Borough form of New Jersey municipal government, which is used in 218 municipalities (of the 564) statewide, making it the most common form of government in New Jersey. The governing body is comprised of a Mayor and a Borough Council, with all positions elected at-large on a partisan basis as part of the November general election. A Mayor is elected directly by the voters to a four-year term of office. The Borough Council is comprised of six members elected to serve three-year terms on a staggered basis, with two seats coming up for election each year in a three-year cycle. The Borough form of government used by North Arlington is a "weak mayor / strong council" government in which council members act as the legislative body with the mayor presiding at meetings and voting only in the event of a tie. The mayor can veto ordinances subject to an override by a two-thirds majority vote of the council. The mayor makes committee and liaison assignments for council members, and most appointments are made by the mayor with the advice and consent of the council.

, the Mayor of North Arlington is Republican Daniel H. Pronti, whose term of office ends December 31, 2026. Pronti, who won the 2018 mayoral election, replaced Joseph P. Bianchi on the ballot, following Biaanchi's death on October 10, 2018; Bianchi, a volunteer firefighter in the borough, who responded to Ground Zero after the September 11 terror attacks, died of cancer he initially contracted at the site. Members of the North Arlington Borough Council are Council President Marijo L. Karcic Jr. (R, 2023), Council Vice President Kirk Del Russo (R, 2025), Donna Bocchino (R, 2023), Lynette Cavadas (R, 2025), Brian A. Fitzhenry (R, 2024) and Allison C. Sheedy (R, 2024).

In January 2019, Kirk DelRusso was unanimously selected from a list of three candidates nominated by the Republican municipal committee to fill the seat expiring in December 2020 that became vacant when Daniel H. Pronti was sworn in to the Mayor's position.

In January 2015, the borough council selected Brian Fitzhenry from a list of three candidates nominated by the Republican municipal committee to fill the council seat that was vacated by Joseph Bianchi when he took office as mayor; Fitzhenry would serve on an interim basis until the November 2015 election. Republicans swept the November 2015 general election, giving the party full control of municipal government. Brian Fitzhenry and Allison Sheedy were elected to full three-year terms, while Mario Karcic Jr., was elected to fill the balance of Joseph Bianchi's council seat expiring in 2016.

Peter Norcia was appointed in February 2013 to fill the vacant seat of Steve Tanelli, who won a seat on the Board of Chosen Freeholders.

Federal, state and county representation
North Arlington is located in the 9th Congressional District and is part of New Jersey's 36th state legislative district.

Politics
As of March 2011, there were a total of 8,594 registered voters in North Arlington, of which 2,839 (33.0% vs. 31.7% countywide) were registered as Democrats, 1,603 (18.7% vs. 21.1%) were registered as Republicans and 4,146 (48.2% vs. 47.1%) were registered as Unaffiliated. There were 6 voters registered as Libertarians or Greens. Among the borough's 2010 Census population, 55.8% (vs. 57.1% in Bergen County) were registered to vote, including 67.8% of those ages 18 and over (vs. 73.7% countywide).

In the 2016 presidential election, Republican Donald Trump received 3,392 votes (48.4% vs. 41.1% countywide), ahead of Democrat Hillary Clinton with 3,351 votes (47.8% vs. 54.2%) and other candidates with 269 votes (3.8% vs. 4.6%), among the 7,097 ballots cast by the borough's 9,594 registered voters, for a turnout of 74.0% (vs. 72.5% in Bergen County). In the 2012 presidential election, Democrat Barack Obama received 3,706 votes (56.7% vs. 54.8% countywide), ahead of Republican Mitt Romney with 2,703 votes (41.3% vs. 43.5%) and other candidates with 55 votes (0.8% vs. 0.9%), among the 6,541 ballots cast by the borough's 9,138 registered voters, for a turnout of 71.6% (vs. 70.4% in Bergen County). In the 2008 presidential election, Republican John McCain received 3,500 votes (49.1% vs. 44.5% countywide), ahead of Democrat Barack Obama with 3,454 votes (48.5% vs. 53.9%) and other candidates with 76 votes (1.1% vs. 0.8%), among the 7,124 ballots cast by the borough's 9,317 registered voters, for a turnout of 76.5% (vs. 76.8% in Bergen County). In the 2004 presidential election, Republican George W. Bush received 3,376 votes (49.3% vs. 47.2% countywide), ahead of Democrat John Kerry with 3,370 votes (49.2% vs. 51.7%) and other candidates with 51 votes (0.7% vs. 0.7%), among the 6,847 ballots cast by the borough's 9,072 registered voters, for a turnout of 75.5% (vs. 76.9% in the whole county).

In the 2013 gubernatorial election, Republican Chris Christie received 60.0% of the vote (2,477 cast), ahead of Democrat Barbara Buono with 39.1% (1,613 votes), and other candidates with 0.9% (38 votes), among the 4,256 ballots cast by the borough's 8,783 registered voters (128 ballots were spoiled), for a turnout of 48.5%. In the 2009 gubernatorial election, Republican Chris Christie received 2,131 votes (47.6% vs. 45.8% countywide), ahead of Democrat Jon Corzine with 1,953 votes (43.6% vs. 48.0%), Independent Chris Daggett with 295 votes (6.6% vs. 4.7%) and other candidates with 30 votes (0.7% vs. 0.5%), among the 4,476 ballots cast by the borough's 8,940 registered voters, yielding a 50.1% turnout (vs. 50.0% in the county).

Education
Students in pre-kindergarten through twelfth grade are educated by the North Arlington School District. As of the 2018–19 school year, the district, comprised of five schools, had an enrollment of 1,869 students and 135.1 classroom teachers (on an FTE basis), for a student–teacher ratio of 13.8:1. Schools in the district (with 2018–19 school enrollment data from the National Center for Education Statistics) are 
Thomas Jefferson Elementary School with 298 students in grades K–5, 
Franklin Roosevelt Elementary School with 226 students in grades K–5, 
George Washington Elementary School with 357 students in grades K–5, 
North Arlington Middle School with 422 students in grades 6–8 and 
North Arlington High School with 532 students in grades 9–12. In 2010, Roosevelt Elementary School was recognized with the National Blue Ribbon Schools Award of Excellence by the United States Department of Education.

In the 1970s and 1980s, declining enrollment led North Arlington to be one of the few school districts in the state that featured involuntary "combined classes" whereby classes at their Roosevelt School for grades 4 and 5 and for grades 6 and 7 were combined into a single classroom with a single teacher for each pair of grades.

Public school students from the borough, and all of Bergen County, are eligible to attend the secondary education programs offered by the Bergen County Technical Schools, which include the Bergen County Academies in Hackensack, Applied Technology High School on Bergen Community College Campus, and the Bergen Tech campus in Teterboro or Paramus. The district offers programs on a shared-time or full-time basis, with admission based on a selective application process and tuition covered by the student's home school district.

Queen of Peace, a Roman Catholic parish, operates a parochial school, Queen of Peace Elementary School, which was founded in 1923 and serves Pre-K to 8th grade, under the auspices of Roman Catholic Archdiocese of Newark.  Queen of Peace High School, which served 9th–12th grades and was founded in 1930, closed after the 2016–17 school year. Despite a fundraising campaign that raised $1 million, in May 2017, the Archdiocese of Newark announced the closing of the high school as of June 30, 2017, in the wake of sharply dropping enrollment and financial challenges, though the affiliated K–8 grammar school remained open.

Emergency services

Police
The North Arlington Police Department (NAPD) protects and services the citizens of North Arlington. The Chief of Police is Scott Hedenberg. The police department is located at 214 Ridge Road.

Fire
The North Arlington Fire Department (NAFD) is an all-volunteer fire department organized in 1910. The department is staffed by 80 fully trained firefighters. There are three separate firehouses. The three separate firehouses are manned by three fire companies: Hose Company 1 (established in 1910), Schuyler Engine Company 2 (established in 1916), and Eagle Truck Company 3 (established in 1923).

Apparatus
Stationed at Company 1: Engine 1 and Special Service Unit 39-SSU 
Stationed at Company 2: Engine 2 and Engine 6
Stationed at Company 3: Ladder 3 and Rescue 5

Chiefs
39-00 – Chief John Nichols
39-10 – Assistant Chief Brian Heinzman
39-20 – Deputy Chief Thomas Kropp

Ambulance
The North Arlington Volunteer Emergency Squad works with a paid staff Monday thru Friday 6am - 6pm and volunteer staff from 6pm to 6am Monday through Friday and day and night Saturday and Sunday.

The North Arlington Volunteer Emergency Squad (NAVES), was founded on June 2, 1972. The squad consists of 55 members(2018) ranging in ages from 16 to 58 years of age. 
NAVES currently operates four ambulances and a First Responder/ Command Vehicle. Operations Staff consists of a captain and three lieutenants. There is a Crew Chief on each tour that reports to a lieutenant. Executive Board Staff Consists of President, Vice President, Treasurer, Secretary, and two trustees. NAVES has a youth squad and a growing Auxiliary which assist in non-riding functions such as fundraising and administrative duties.

Transportation

Roads and highways

Route 7 and Route 17 meet at the intersection of Ridge Road (Route 17) and Belleville Turnpike (Route 7), the latter of which crosses the Passaic River on the Belleville Turnpike Bridge. The bridge, also known as the Rutgers Street Bridge, connects the borough to  Belleville in Essex County. The bridge was formally renamed on July 4, 2013, as the "Lance Corporal Osbrany Montes de Oca Memorial Bridge" in memory of a United States Marine Corps infantryman from North Arlington who was killed in February 2012 while serving in Afghanistan.

Public transportation
NJ Transit bus routes 30, 40 and 76 provide service to and from Newark.

Notable people

People who were born in, residents of, or otherwise closely associated with North Arlington include:
 Heinrich Gebhard (1878–1963), pianist, composer and piano teacher
 Derek Jeter (born 1974), shortstop who played his entire career for the New York Yankees
 William D. McDowell (1927–2007), politician who served as Bergen County's first County Executive and had been Mayor of North Arlington
 Diane Ruggiero (born 1969), screenwriter for Veronica Mars
 Frank Sowinski, former professional basketball player.
 James Thomas, guitarist and composer, of the San Francisco psychedelic instrumental band The Mermen
 James Zadroga (1971–2006), NYPD officer, participant in the cleanup after the September 11 terrorist attacks and namesake of the James Zadroga 9/11 Health and Compensation Act of 2010

References

Related reading

 Municipal Incorporations of the State of New Jersey (according to Counties) prepared by the Division of Local Government, Department of the Treasury (New Jersey); December 1, 1958.
 Clayton, W. Woodford; and Nelson, William. History of Bergen and Passaic Counties, New Jersey, with Biographical Sketches of Many of its Pioneers and Prominent Men., Philadelphia: Everts and Peck, 1882.
 Harvey, Cornelius Burnham (ed.), Genealogical History of Hudson and Bergen Counties, New Jersey. New York: New Jersey Genealogical Publishing Co., 1900.
 Van Valen, James M. History of Bergen County, New Jersey. New York: New Jersey Publishing and Engraving Co., 1900.
 Westervelt, Frances A. (Frances Augusta), 1858–1942, History of Bergen County, New Jersey, 1630–1923, Lewis Historical Publishing Company, 1923.

External links

 North Arlington official website
 North Arlington School District
 
 School Data for the North Arlington School District, National Center for Education Statistics
 North Arlington High School Band

 
1896 establishments in New Jersey
Borough form of New Jersey government
Boroughs in Bergen County, New Jersey
New Jersey Meadowlands District
Populated places established in 1896